Fabrizio Zardini is an Italian para-alpine skier. He represented Italy in cross-country skiing at the 1992 Winter Paralympics. He then moved to alpine skiing and represented Italy in alpine skiing at the 1998, 2002 and 2006 Winter Paralympics. In 2002, he won the gold medal in the Men's Super-G LW11 event and the bronze medal in the Men's Downhill LW11 event.

References

External links
 

Living people
Year of birth missing (living people)
Place of birth missing (living people)
Italian male alpine skiers
Paralympic alpine skiers of Italy
Cross-country skiers at the 1992 Winter Paralympics
Alpine skiers at the 1998 Winter Paralympics
Alpine skiers at the 2002 Winter Paralympics
Alpine skiers at the 2006 Winter Paralympics
Medalists at the 2002 Winter Paralympics
Paralympic gold medalists for Italy
Paralympic silver medalists for Italy
Paralympic medalists in alpine skiing
21st-century Italian people